Leicester Coritanian Athletics Club is an athletics club based in Leicester, England. It is based at the Saffron Lane sports centre. The club competes at all levels in senior and junior road racing, cross country, and track and field.

The name is derived from the Celtic tribe the Corieltauvi who inhabited Leicester and the surrounding area in the Iron Age.

The club was founded in 1969.

External links
 Official website
 Power of 10 link

Sport in Leicester
Athletics clubs in England
Sports clubs established in 1969
Athletics in Leicestershire
1969 establishments in England